Dromedario, also known as Fibok–Sidermec–Müller, was an Italian and Swiss professional cycling team that existed from 1983 to 1987.

The team competed in five consecutive editions of the Giro d'Italia, having entered each year of its existence.

Major wins
1983
 Giro dell'Emilia, Cesare Cipollini
1985
 Gran Premio di Lugano, Gottfried Schmutz
 Giro della Provincia di Reggio Calabria, Silvano Riccò
1986
 Giro dell'Umbria, Stefano Colagè

References

Defunct cycling teams based in Italy
Defunct cycling teams based in Switzerland
1983 establishments in Italy
1987 disestablishments in Switzerland
Cycling teams established in 1983
Cycling teams disestablished in 1987